This is a list of Bien de Interés Cultural landmarks in the Province of Segovia, Spain.

 Cuéllar Castle
 Tower of San Esteban

References 

 
Segovia
Bien de Interés Cultural landmarks in Castile and León
Buildings and structures in the Province of Segovia